Erinç Seymen (born 1980 Istanbul) is a Turkish artist.

Life
He graduated from Mimar Sinan Fine Arts University, Painting Department in 2006 and received his MA from Yıldız Technical University Art and Design Faculty, with a thesis about Bob Flanagan.

He participated in conferences and his articles has been published in various magazines on topics such as militarism, nationalism and gender issues. 
Since 2002, he has participated in several solo and group exhibitions in Istanbul, Ankara, Vienna, Paris, London, Helsinki, Eindhoven and Lisbon. 
The group exhibitions he participated in are: "Along the Gates of Urban", K&S Galerie, Berlin (2004); "An Atlas of Events", Foundation Calouste Gulbenkian, Lisbon (2007); "I Myself am War!", Open Space, Vienna (2008); "Istanbul, traversée", Palais des Beaux Arts de Lille, Lille (2009); "Moods: A Generation that Goes off the Rails", École nationale supérieure des Beaux-Arts, Paris (2010). Erinc Seymen lives and works in Istanbul.

Selected solo exhibitions

2009	
 Art Forum Berlin (Galerist Solo Booth), Berlin / Germany
 Persuasion Room, Galerist, Istanbul / Turkey
2007	
 Man Jam, Finnish Museum of Photography, Helsinki / Finland
 Gays Can Shoot Straight Too, Van Abbemuseum, Eindhoven / NL
 Hunting Season, Galerist, Istanbul / Turkey
2006	
 Untitled, Masa Project, Istanbul / Turkey
2005	
 Violation Exercises, Galerist, Istanbul / Turkey
2003	
 Uncanny Distance, Galerist, Istanbul / Turkey

Selected group exhibitions

2010	
 Atesin Dustugu Yer, Depo, Istanbul / Turkey
 Port İzmir 2, İnternational Contemporary Art Triennial, Izmir / Turkey
 When Ideas Become Crime, Depo, Istanbul / Turkey
 Istanbul Cool! What's Happening in Contemporary Turkish Art Now, Leila Taghinia-Milani Heler (LTMH) gallery, New York / USA
 État D'ames, École nationale supérieure des Beaux-Arts, Paris / France
2009	
 Istanbul Traversee, Lille 3000, Lille / France
 Materiak.picture, Operation Room, Istanbul / Turkey
2008	
 Moment of Agency – Filmprogram, Kunsthalle Basel, Basel / Switzerland
 I Myself am War, Open Space, Vienna / Austria
 Save as.. Triennale Bosiva, Milano / Italy
 Reasonable, Hafriyat, Istanbul / Turkey
 Photonic Moments, Fotogalerie des Rathaus, Graz / Austria
 Photonic Moments, Gallery of the Cankarjev Dom Cultural Center, Ljubljana / Slovenia
2007	
 Be a Realist, Demand the İmpossible!, Karşı Sanat, Istanbul / Turkey
 Istanbul Now, Lukas Feichtner Galerie, Istanbul / Turkey
 Border-Disorder, Kraljevo / Serbia
 An Atlas of Events, Calouste Gulbenkian Foundation, Antonio Pinto Ribeiro, Lisbon / Portugal
 Alternative Election Posters, Hafriyat, Istanbul / Turkey
 Working Space, Pera Museum, Istanbul / Turkey
 Flat Tire K2, Izmir / Turkey
2006	
 Home and Away, UGM Gallery, Maribor / Slovenia
 Ardindan Degil Karşısına, Radikal Art, Bremen / Germany
 Topkapi, Künstlerhaus Guterabfertigund, Bremen / Germany
 Visions, Hotel Athens Imperial, Athens / Greece
 Works on Paper, Galerist, Istanbul / Turkey
2005
 Free Kick, Antrepo No.5, Istanbul / Turkey
2004	
 Along the Gates of Urban, K&S Galerie, Berlin / Germany
 Along the Gates of Urban, Oda Projesi, Istanbul / Turkey
 Visitor, Galerist, Istanbul / Turkey
2003
 I’m too Sad to Kill You, Proje4L, Istanbul / Turkey
 Good, Bad and Ugly, Atölye 111, Bilgi University, Istanbul / Turkey
2002	
 Under the Beach: the Pavement, Proje4L, Istanbul / Turkey

References

External links
http://www.artnet.com/artists/erinc-seymen/past-auction-results
http://www.artfacts.net/en/artist/erinc-seymen-80307/profile.html
https://web.archive.org/web/20100401113437/http://www.i-straddle.com/2009/05/erinc-seymen-galerist.html
http://www.sothebys.com/en/catalogues/ecatalogue.html/2011/contemporary-art-turkish-l11221#/r=/en/ecat.fhtml.L11221.html+r.m=/en/ecat.lot.L11221.html/44/
http://opymoscollection.com/artist_detail.asp?AID=32

Living people
1980 births
Turkish artists